El Libertador Air Base  is a military airport and base for the Venezuelan Air Force. It is located in Maracay, a city in central Venezuela and the capital of the state of Aragua.

Facilities 

References

External links
 

Airports in Venezuela
Buildings and structures in Aragua
Buildings and structures in Maracay